Menelaus of Alexandria (Menelaos ho Alexandreus; c. 70 – 140 CE) was a Greek  mathematician and astronomer, the first to recognize geodesics on a curved surface as natural analogs of straight lines.

Life and works

Although very little is known about Menelaus's life, it is supposed that he lived in Rome, where he probably moved after having spent his youth in Alexandria. He was called Menelaus of Alexandria by both Pappus of Alexandria and Proclus, and a conversation of his with Lucius, held in Rome, is recorded by Plutarch.

Ptolemy (2nd century CE) also mentions, in his work Almagest (VII.3), two astronomical observations made by Menelaus in Rome in January of the year 98. These were occultations of the stars Spica and Beta Scorpii by the moon, a few nights apart. Ptolemy used these observations to confirm precession of the equinoxes, a phenomenon that had been discovered by Hipparchus in the 2nd century BCE.

Sphaerica is the only book that has survived, in an Arabic translation. Composed of three books, it deals with the geometry of the sphere and its application in astronomical measurements and calculations. The book introduces the concept of spherical triangle (figures formed of three great circle arcs, which he named "trilaterals") and proves Menelaus' theorem on collinearity of points on the edges of a triangle (which may have been previously known) and its analog for spherical triangles. It was later translated by the sixteenth century astronomer and mathematician Francesco Maurolico.

The lunar crater Menelaus is named after him.

Bibliography
The titles of a few books by Menelaus have been preserved:

 On the calculation of the chords in a circle, composed of six books
 Elements of geometry, composed of three books, later edited by Thabit ibn Qurra
 On the knowledge of the weights and distributions of different bodies
 He may also have written a star catalogue.

Notes

References
 Ivor Bulmer-Thomas. "Menelaus of Alexandria." Dictionary of Scientific Biography 9:296-302.
 Pedro Pablo Fuentes González, “Ménélaos d’Alexandrie”, in R. Goulet (ed.), Dictionnaire des Philosophes Antiques, vol. IV, Paris, CNRS, 2005, p. 456-464.

 Roshdi Rashed and Athanase Papadopoulos, Menelaus' Spherics. Early Translation and al-Māhānī / al-Harawī's Version. De Gruyter, Scientia Graeco-Arabica 21. xiv, 874 pages.

External links 
 
 

70 births
140 deaths
2nd-century Greek people
Ancient Greek geometers
Ancient Greek astronomers
Roman-era Alexandrians
2nd-century mathematicians
1st-century astronomers